Clones is a 1998 anthology of science fiction short stories revolving around cloning edited by Jack Dann and Gardner Dozois. Clones is part of the long-running Jack Dann and Gardner Dozois Ace anthology series.

Contents 
"The Extra" (Greg Egan)
"The Phantom of Kansas" (John Varley)
"Nine Lives" (Ursula K. Le Guin)
"Past Magic" (Ian R. MacLeod)
"Where Late the Sweet Birds Sang" (Kate Wilhelm)
"Out of Copyright" (Charles Sheffield)
"Mary" (Damon Knight)
"Clone Sister" (Pamela Sargent)
"Blood Sisters" (Joe Haldeman)

External links 
 Clones listing at ISFDB

1998 anthologies
Jack Dann and Gardner Dozois Ace anthologies
Ace Books books
Cloning in fiction